GA6, GA-6, or GA 6 may refer to:

 , a micro-asteroid of the Apollo group
 Georgia State Route 6, a state highway in Georgia, United States
 Georgia's 6th congressional district, congressional district in Georgia, United States
 Trumpchi GA6, a 2014–present Chinese mid-size sedan